Andrew Robert White (born 28 August 1974), also known as Whitey, is the lead and rhythm guitarist of the English indie rock band Kaiser Chiefs.

Biography
Whitey was born 28 August 1974 in Leeds. He is a former student of Garforth Community College and Leeds Metropolitan University. He is left-handed.

He is an original member of the band Runston Parva, which later became Parva, changing the name to Kaiser Chiefs in 2004. The name was adapted from Kaizer Chiefs, the former club of Lucas Radebe who was at the time with Leeds United.

References

External links

Kaiser Chiefs members
Alumni of Leeds Beckett University
English rock guitarists
English male guitarists
British indie rock musicians
1974 births
Living people
Ivor Novello Award winners
People from Swillington
Musicians from Leeds
People educated at Garforth Academy